One Mo' Time is a musical revue conceived by Vernel Bagneris. It is an evening of 1920s African-American vaudeville, set in the Lyric Theatre of New Orleans in 1926.

The Lyric Theatre was on the black vaudeville circuit known as the Theatre Owners Booking Association (T.O.B.A.).

The Off-Broadway production opened in New York at the Village Gate Theatre in October 1979. At the 23rd Annual Grammy Awards in 1980, the show's recording was nominated for Best Original Cast Show Album. One of the members in the orchestra was the legendary trumpeter Jabbo Smith, who was a rival of Luis Armstrong in the late 1920s. Smith can be heard frequently in the musical's recording.

The 1981 West End production, at the Cambridge Theatre, was nominated for the Olivier Award for Best New Musical. The musical was revived for a short Broadway season at the Longacre Theatre in 2002.

References 

1979 musicals
Off-Broadway musicals
Broadway musicals
West End musicals